Tehuelche (Aoniken, Inaquen, Gunua-Kena, Gununa-Kena) is one of the Chonan languages of Patagonia. Its speakers were nomadic hunters who occupied territory in present-day Chile, north of Tierra del Fuego and south of the Mapuche people. It is also known as Aonikenk or Aonekko 'a'ien.

The decline of the language started with the Mapuche invasion in the north, that was then followed by the occupation of Patagonia by the Chilean and Argentinian states and state-facilitated genocide. Tehuelche were considerably influenced by other languages and cultures, in particular Mapudungun (the language of the Mapuche). This allowed the transference of morpho-syntactical elements into Tehuelche. During the 19th and 20th centuries, Spanish became the dominant language as Argentina and Chile gained independence, and Spanish-speaking settlers took possession of Patagonia. Because of these factors the language was dying out. In 1983/84 there were 29 speakers but by the year 2000 there were only 4 speakers left of Tehuelche, by 2012 only 2, and by 2019 the last speaker died. As of 2000 the Tehuelche ethnic group numbered 200. Today many members of the Tehuelche ethnic group have limited knowledge of the language and are doing their best to ensure language revival, as Tehuelche is still a very important symbol for the group of people who identify themselves as Tehuelche.

In spite of the death of Dora Manchado in 2019, the language has been documented (from her), recuperated and revitalized by various groups of Aonikenks, with the collaboration of a group of linguists and anthropologists, that have made various studies and academic works about this language.

Classification

Tehuelche belongs to the Chonan family together with Teushen, Selk'nam (Ona) and Haush. The latter two languages, spoken by tribes in northeast and far northeast Tierra del Fuego, has different statuses of documentation and linguistic revitalization by their corresponding communities.

Dialects
Mason (1950) lists dialects as:

Northern: Payniken; Poya
Southern: Inaken

Phonology

Vowels
Tehuelche has 3 vocalic qualities which can be short or long. (Fernandez 1988: 87-88)

Consonants
Tehuelche has 25 consonantal phonemes. Stops can be plain, glottalized or voiced. (Fernández 1998: 88-89)

Morphology

Pronoun

Noun

Verb

References

 Fernández Garay, Ana V. (1997): Testimonios de los últimos tehuelches. Buenos Aires: Universidad de Buenos Aires.(Spanish)
 Fernández Garay, Ana V. (1998): El tehuelche. Una lengua en vías de extinción. Valdivia: Universidad Austral de Chile [Anejos de Estudios Filológicos 15]. (Spanish)
 Fernández Garay, Ana V. (2004): Diccionario tehuelche-español / índice español-tehuelche. Leiden: University of Leiden [Indigenous Languages of Latin America 4].(Spanish)
 Viegas Barros, J. Pedro (2005): Voces en el viento. Raíces lingüísticas de la Patagonia. Buenos Aires: Mondragón.(Spanish)
 Ana Fernandez Garay, La nominalizacion de lenguas indigenas de la Patagonia, Puebla, México,2006 (Spanish)

External links
Tehuelche (Intercontinental Dictionary Series)
kketo sh m ´ekot - lengua tehuelche (Tehuelche community website)
Qadeshiakk - Materials about the language

Languages of Argentina
Chonan languages
Endangered indigenous languages of the Americas
Indigenous languages of the South American Cone